The Ministry of Foreign Affairs of the Republic of China (Taiwan) (MOFA) is a ministry of the Republic of China (Taiwan). Governed as the cabinet level policy-making body under the Executive Yuan since 1928, the fundamental purpose of the ministry is to promote, expand, and conduct bilateral foreign affairs with other nations. Though the ministry was founded on 1 January 1912 when the Republic was founded, the ministry dates its origins on 11 March 1861 as the Office in Charge of Affairs Concerning All Nations in the Qing dynasty. The current Foreign Minister is Joseph Wu. The MOFA headquartered in Zhongzheng District in Taipei.

The agency is in charge of interactions between the Republic of China and foreign countries except the People's Republic of China, which falls under the jurisdiction of the Mainland Affairs Council. It is responsible for formulating foreign policies, decisions, foreign affairs documents, and statements in regard to the ROC. It also negotiates and signs bilateral and multilateral foreign treaties and agreements. The agency also dispatches foreign affairs and TECRO representatives to other countries.

Administration

MOFA is composed of the following departmental structures:

Departmental Structure
 Secretariat
 Department of East Asian and Pacific Affairs
 Department of West Asian and African Affairs
 Department of European Affairs
 Department of North American Affairs
 Department of Latin American and Caribbean Affairs
 Department of Treaty and Legal Affairs
 Department of International Organizations 
 Department of International Cooperation and Economic Affairs
 Department of International Information Services
 Department of Policy Planning
 Department of Protocol
 Department of General Affairs
 Department of Personnel
 Department of Civil Service Ethics
 Department of Accounting
 Department of Archives, Information Management and Telecommunications
 Public Diplomacy Coordination Council
 Department of NGO International Affairs
 The Office of Parliamentarian Affairs
 Bureau of Consular Affairs
 Institute of Diplomacy and International Affairs
 Taiwan–Japan Relations Association
 Coordination Council for North American Affairs
 Central Taiwan Office
 Southern Taiwan Office
 Eastern Taiwan Office
 Southwestern Taiwan Office

Budget
According to statistics published by the Directorate-General of Budget, Accounting and Statistics for Fiscal Year 2011, the budget for MOFA is equivalent to approx. 10.37% of the budget for the Ministry of National Defense (MND). The MND budget for 2011 has been announced to be US$9.2 billion. Hence, an estimated MOFA budget figure for Fiscal Year 2011 is US$954 million.

Diplomatic relations

The Republic of China has diplomatic relations with 14 countries.

Oceania

North America

South America

Africa

Europe

Republic of China Representative Offices Abroad

For countries with which the Republic of China does not have formal diplomatic relations, representation is often referred to as the Taipei Economic and Cultural Office, Taipei Economic and Cultural Representatives Office or Taipei Representative Offices, which serve the same function as embassy or consulate.

Foreign missions in the Republic of China

 Embassy of the Republic of Nauru
 Embassy of Saint Christopher and Nevis
 Embassy of Belize
 Embassy of the Republic of Palau
 Embassy of the Republic of the Marshall Islands
 Embassy of the Republic of Honduras
 Embassy of the Kingdom of Eswatini
 Apostolic Nunciature

Ministers

Access
The MOFA building is accessible by NTU Hospital Station of the Taipei Metro on the Red Line.

See also 
 List of foreign ministers of the Republic of China
 Foreign relations of the Republic of China

References

External links 

Official website of Ministry of Foreign Affairs (TAIWAN) 

1861 establishments in China
1912 establishments in China
Foreign Affairs
Taiwan
Foreign relations of Taiwan
Ministries established in 1861
Ministries established in 1912